Zayd ibn Mūsā ibn Jaʿfar ibn Muḥammad ibn ʿAlī ibn Al-Ḥusayn ibn ʿAlī ibn Abī Ṭālib (Arabic: زيد بن موسى بن جعفر بن محمد بن علي بن الحسين بن علي بن أبي طالب) was a younger son of the seventh  Imam in Twelver Shia Islam, Musa al-Kazim. 

He took part in the unsuccessful Alid uprising in 815 against the Abbasid Caliphate, led by Abu'l-Saraya, during which he captured and governed the city of Basra. According to al-Tabari, his reign was characterized by a pogrom against the supporters of the Abbasids, which earned him the nickname Zayd al-Nar ('Zayd of the Fire') due to the large numbers of houses belonging to Abbasid family members or their followers that he ordered torched. After the defeat of Abu'l-Saraya at Kufa, Basra held out for a while, until captured by the Abbasid general Ali ibn Abi Sa'id. Zayd received a letter of safe passage from Ali, and surrendered to him. His brother, Ibrahim, also took part in the uprising and ruled Yemen for a while.

Before long, Zayd escaped his imprisonment, and rose again in revolt at Anbar in June 816, along with Abu'l-Saraya's brother. They were soon defeated by Abbasid troops and again captured.

References

Sources 
 

8th-century births
9th-century deaths
9th-century Arabs
9th-century people from the Abbasid Caliphate
9th-century Shia Muslims
Rebels from the Abbasid Caliphate
Fourth Fitna
Husaynids
History of Basra
Iraq under the Abbasid Caliphate
Zaydis